Giving Yourself Away is the fourth album by Officium Triste, released in 2007 by Displeased Records.

Track listing
  "Your Eyes"   – 9:48 
  "My Charcoal Heart"   – 5:27
  "Signals"   – 7:25
  "On the Crossroads of Souls"   – 8:04  
  "Inside the Mind"   – 8:48
  "Master of Your Own Demise"   – 8:14

Personnel
 Pim Blankenstein – vocals
 Johan Kwakernaak – rhythm guitar
 Martin Kwakernaak – drums, keyboards
 Gerard de Jong – lead guitar
 Lawrence Meyer – bass guitar

Officium Triste albums
2007 albums